North Star is a name of Polaris in its role as northern pole star.

North Star or North Stars may also refer to:

Places

United States 
 Fairbanks North Star Borough, Alaska
 North Star, California, a place in Yuba County, California
 North Star, Delaware, a census-designated place
 North Star, Minnesota, an unincorporated community
 North Star, Ohio, a village
 North Star, U.S. Virgin Islands
 North Star, Wisconsin, an unincorporated community
 North Star Township (disambiguation)

Elsewhere 
 North Star, New South Wales, Australia, a village
 North Star, Alberta, Canada, a hamlet

Transport

Air
 Canadair North Star, a passenger aircraft manufactured by Canadair for Trans Canada Airlines
 Custom Flight North Star, a Canadian amateur-built aircraft design

Land
 North Star (broad gauge locomotive) (1837–1871), a Star class locomotive of the Great Western Railway
 North Star (1866–1902), a GWR 378 Class locomotive
 North Star (1898–1912), a GWR 3031 Class locomotive renamed Bulkeley in 1906
 North Star (1906–29), a GWR 4000 Class locomotive, rebuilt to 4073 Class in 1929
 North Star (1929–57), a GWR 4073 Class locomotive rebuilt from the above
 North Star (Amtrak train), a former train route in Minnesota
 North Star (NYC train) a New York Central Railroad train, 1947–1962, operating New York–Cleveland, with a branch to the Adirondacks
 North Star, a brand of NZ Bus in Auckland, New Zealand
 Northstar Line, a commuter train line in metropolitan Minneapolis, Minnesota

Sea
 HMS North Star, several ships in the British Royal Navy 
 MS North Star, built in 1966 as Marburg, a small expedition ship
 North Star (sternwheeler 1897), a river steamer in Montana and British Columbia
 North Star (sternwheeler 1902), a steamboat in Washington state
 North Star, built 1937, used by the U.S. Navy as coastal minesweeper USS Crossbill
 North Star, a roll-on/roll-off cargo ship featured in the documentary series Mighty Ships
 North Star (narrowboat), a wooden horse-drawn icebreaker built in 1868, now at the Black Country Living Museum, England
 USCGC North Star (WPG-59), U.S. Coast Guard Cutter during the Second World War

Film
 North Star (1925 film), directed by Paul Powell
 The North Star (1943 film), a war film directed by Lewis Milestone
 North Star: Mark di Suvero, 1977 documentary
 The North Star (1982 film) or L'Étoile du Nord, a French film
 North Star (1996 film), an action Western directed by Nils Gaup
 The North Star (2016 film), an American film about slavery and the underground railroad
 The North Star: Finding Black Mecca, a 2021 film about Black Canadian settlements in Ontario

Television
 North Star (TV series), an Israeli teen drama
 "North Star" (Black-ish), a 2018 episode of the American television sitcom
 "North Star" (Glenn Martin, DDS episode), an episode of Glenn Martin, DDS
 "North Star" (Star Trek: Enterprise), a third season episode of Star Trek: Enterprise

Music
The North Star (Roddy Frame album), 1998
North Star (Curved Air album), 2014
 "North Star" (Offset song), 2019, from Father of 4
 "North Star", a song from the 1979 album Exposure by Robert Fripp
 "North Star", a song by Faithless featuring Dido from the 2010 album The Dance
 "North Star", an unreleased song from the U2 360° Tour
 "North Star", a 1977 composition by Philip Glass, written for the soundtrack of the 1977 documentary
 North Star, a British record label and music group formed by members of Tottenham Mandem

Companies and brands
 Beijing North Star, a conglomerate company in Beijing, China
 North Star Computers, a company established in 1976
 North Star Mine and Powerhouse, Grass Valley, California, USA
 North Star Mall, a shopping center in San Antonio, Texas
 North Star Hotel, a hotel in Vancouver, Canada
 North Star (My Little Pony), a toy animal
 North Star, a brand of shoes owned by Bata Shoes
 North Star Yachts, a Canadian boat builder

Education
 North Star Middle School (disambiguation)
 North Star School District, Pennsylvania
 North Star Self-Directed Learning for Teens, an education center based in Sunderland, Massachusetts, United States
 North Stars, nickname of St. Charles North High School, Illinois

Sports
 Minnesota North Stars, a team in the National Hockey League between 1967 and 1993
 Île-des-Chênes North Stars, a defunct Canadian senior hockey team, 2003 Allan Cup champions
 Kildonan North Stars, a team in the Manitoba Junior Hockey League between 1976 and 1990

Other uses
 The North Star (anti-slavery newspaper), published from 1847–1851 by the abolitionist Frederick Douglass
 North Star (organization), an organization for LGBT Mormons
 North Star House (Grass Valley, California), on the National Register of Historic Places, associated with the mine
 The North Star, an online newspaper launched in 2018 by activist Shaun King
 North Star, the code name of the Turkish Brigade with the United Nations Command during the Korean War

See also

 Étoile du Nord (train) or North Star, a former international express train in Europe
 "North Star State", nickname of the U.S. state of Minnesota
 Star of the North (disambiguation)
 Northern Star (disambiguation) 
 Northstar (disambiguation)
 North (disambiguation)
 Star (disambiguation)
 
 
 Estrella del norte (disambiguation)
 Estrela do Norte (disambiguation)
 Étoile du Nord (disambiguation)
 Nordstern (disambiguation)
 Nordstar (disambiguation)